The 2003–04 Sporting de Gijón season was the sixth consecutive season of the club in Segunda División after its last relegation from La Liga.

Overview
In July 2003, due to the financial difficulties, Real Sporting sold David Villa to Zaragoza by €2.5m

On 15 February 2004, in the game at Algeciras, Roberto beat the record for the longest clean sheet in Real Sporting at 727 minutes.

On 23 May 2004, Real Sporting earned one point at SD Eibar in the additional time, in a game where the rojiblancos ended with eight players after the referee sent off Yago, Cristian Díaz and David Bauzá in ten minutes.

Real Sporting ended the season in the fifth position, finally failing to promote and with 13 red cards.

Squad

From the youth squad

Competitions

Segunda División

Results by round

League table

Matches

Copa del Rey

Matches

Squad statistics

Appearances and goals

|}

References

External links
Profile at BDFutbol
Official website

Sporting de Gijón seasons
Sporting de Gijon